Jim Cartwright (born 27 June 1958) is an English dramatist, born in Farnworth, Lancashire. Cartwright's first play, Road, won a number of awards before being adapted for TV and broadcast by the BBC. His work has been translated into more than 40 languages.

Plays by Jim Cartwright 
 1986 Road - Royal Court Theatre, London. Winner of: George Devine Award; Plays and Players Award; Drama Magazine Award; Samuel Beckett Award. directed by Simon Curtis.
 1988 Bed - National Theatre. directed by Julia Bardsley
 1989 Two - Octagon. Young Vic Theatre. Winner of: Manchester Evening News Theatre Award for Best New Play. directed by Andy Hay
 1990 Baths - Octagon. directed by Andy Hay
 1991 Eight Miles High - Octagon * 1994 & 1995 Bristol Theatre Royal Nominated for Theatre Management Association Best Musical Award. directed by Andy Hay
 1992 The Rise and Fall of Little Voice - Winner of: Evening Standard Award for Best Comedy of the Year; Laurence Olivier Award for Best Comedy directed by Sam Mendes.
 1996 I Licked A Slag's Deodorant - The Ambassadors Theatre, West end. directed by Jim Cartwright
 1999  Prize Night - Royal Exchange Theatre. directed by Greg Hersov.
 2000 Hard Fruit - Royal Court Theatre, London. directed by James Macdonald
 2012 A Christmas Fair - Milton Rooms directed by Nick Bagnal
 2013 Mobile Phone show - National Theatre directed by Nicky Lander
 2015 The Ancient Secret of Youth and the Five Tibetans - Octagon Theatre Bolton. directed by David Thacker
 2015 RAZ - Edinburgh Festival (Winner of Fringe First Award 2015), 2016 Trafalgar Studios, London & Nationwide tour. Directed by Anthony Banks.
 2016 Two 2 - Octagon Theatre Bolton.  Directed by David Thacker.
 2017 Stand Up Stand down - Theatre Royal Wakefield, Nationwide tour. Directed by Jim Cartwright.

Films
Road (1987) Winner of Golden Nymph Award. directed by Alan Clarke.
Little Voice (1998) Nominated for 19 awards
Bed (1995) BBC
Vroom (1988) Chosen as Centre Piece at the London Film Festival directed by Beeban Kidron.
Strumpet (2001) BBC directed by Danny Boyle.
Vacuuming Completely Nude in Paradise (2001) BBC directed by Danny Boyle
Johnny Shakespeare (2008) BBC 1. Winner of two Royal television Society awards. directed by Jim Cartwright
 King of The Teds (2012) Sky TV. directed by Jim Cartwright

Radio
 Baths (1987) BBC radio 4. Directed by Penny Black
 Sung  (2015) BBC radio 4. Directed by Gary Brown

Novels
Supermarket Supermodel (2008) Random House

References

External links
 
 
 

1958 births
Living people
English dramatists and playwrights
People from Farnworth
 
English male dramatists and playwrights